Goldstone Gts Airport (FAA LID: 00CA) is a private airport 28 miles north of Barstow, California.
Permission is required for landing. 
The airport is unattended by ATC, and is in the Los Angeles Center / Riverside FSS.

Resources

References

Airports in San Bernardino County, California